Bindon may refer to

Places 

in England
Bindon, Somerset
Bindon Abbey, Dorset
Bindon Hill, Dorset
Bindon, Axmouth, Devon, a historic manor
Bindon Liberty, a liberty in Dorset, England

People 
Francis Bindon (1690–1765), Irish architect and painter
James J. Bindon (1884–1938), businessman and politician in Newfoundland
Jenny Bindon (born 1973), American soccer player
John Bindon (1943–1993), British actor and criminal
Katy Bindon, Canadian academic
Earl of Bindon, a title extant between 1706 and 1722
Bindon Blood (1842–1940), British soldier